In enzymology, an inosine kinase is an enzyme that catalyzes the chemical reaction

ATP + inosine  ADP + IMP

Thus, the two substrates of this enzyme are ATP and inosine, whereas its two products are ADP and IMP.

Inosine kinase belongs to the phosphofructokinase B (PfkB) family of sugar kinases. Other members of this family (also known as the Ribokinase family) include ribokinase (RK) adenosine kinase (AK), fructokinase, and 1-phosphofructokinase. The members of the PfkB/RK family are identified by the presence of three conserved sequence motifs. The structures of several PfK family of proteins have been determined from a number of organisms and the enzymatic activity of this family of this family of protein shows a dependence on the presence of pentavalent ions. Despite low sequence similarity between inosine kinase and other PfkB family of proteins, these proteins are quite similar at structural levels. Other names in common use include inosine-guanosine kinase, and inosine kinase (phosphorylating).  This enzyme participates in purine metabolism.

References

 

EC 2.7.1
Enzymes of unknown structure